Shawn Dulohery (born May 4, 1965) is a retired American skeet shooter. He competed at the 2004 Olympics and placed fifth.

References

1965 births
Living people
American male sport shooters
United States Distinguished Marksman
Skeet shooters
Olympic shooters of the United States
Shooters at the 2004 Summer Olympics